Suntarsky District (Suntaar uluuha) is an administrative and municipal district (raion, or ulus), one of the thirty-four in the Sakha Republic, Russia. It is located in the western central part of the republic and borders with Nyurbinsky District in the north and northeast, Verkhnevilyuysky District in the east, Olyokminsky District in the southeast, Lensky District in the southwest, and with Mirninsky District in the west. Its administrative center is the rural locality (a selo) of Suntar. Population:  25,485 (2002 Census);  The population of Suntar accounts for 39.9% of the district's total population.

Geography
The main river in the district is the Vilyuy.

Climate

History
The district was established on January 9, 1930.

Demographics
As of the 1989 Census, the ethnic composition was as follows:
Yakuts: 92.5%
Russians: 5.0%
Evens: 0.2%
Evenks: 0.2%
other: 2.1%

Economy 
The economy of the district is mostly based on agriculture. There are deposits of gold, brown coal,  gypsum, anhydrite, construction materials, and others minerals.

Transportation
The Vilyuy Highway runs through the district, connecting it with Yakutsk, Vilyuysk, and Mirny. There is an airport in Suntar.

Inhabited localities

Divisional source:

*Administrative centers are shown in bold

See also 
 Lena Plateau

References

Notes

Sources

Districts of the Sakha Republic